Jean Baker may refer to:

Jean Baker Miller (1927–2006), American psychiatrist, psychoanalyst, social activist, feminist, and author
Jean-Claude Baker (1943–2015), French-American restaurateur
Jean Baker (bowls) (born 1958), English international lawn bowler
Jean H. Baker (born 1933), American historian
Jean-Luc Baker (born 1993), American ice dancer

Fictional characters
Jean DeLynn Baker, character from The 4400

See also
Gene Baker (1925–1999), American baseball player
John Baker (disambiguation)